This list contains songs with lyrics written or co-written by the  English humorist, novelist and playwright P. G. Wodehouse.

References

Wodehouse, P. G.